A haiku in English is an English-language poem written in the Japanese poetry style known as haiku, which correlates the two languages. The degree to which haiku in English resemble classic Japanese haiku varies, but many of these poems draw on short, concise wording and a reference to the seasons.

The first haiku written in English date from the late 19th century, influenced by English translations of traditional Japanese haiku. Many well-known English-language poets have written what they called "haiku", although definitions of the genre have remained disputable. Haiku has also proven popular in English-language schools as a way to encourage the appreciation and writing of poetry.

Typical characteristics
"Haiku" in English is a term sometimes loosely applied to any short, impressionistic poem, but there are certain characteristics that are commonly associated with the genre:

 a focus on nature or the seasons
 a division into two asymmetrical sections that juxtaposes two subjects (e.g. something natural and something human-made, two unexpectedly similar things, etc.)
 a contemplative or wistful tone and an impressionistic brevity
 no superfluous words, but avoiding a "telegram style" syntax
 an emphasis on imagery over exposition
 avoidance of metaphor and similes
 non-rhyming lines

Some additional traits are especially associated with English-language haiku (as opposed to Japanese-language haiku):
 a three-line format with 17 syllables arranged in a 5–7–5 pattern. However, many contemporary haiku poets work in poems containing 10 to 14 syllables, which more nearly approximates the duration of a Japanese haiku. Usually, the second line is the longest. Some poets want their haiku to be expressed in one breath.
 little or no punctuation or capitalization, except that cuts are sometimes marked with dashes or ellipses and proper nouns are usually capitalized.

History

Britain and Australia
In Britain, the editors of The Academy announced the first known English-language haikai contest on April 8, 1899, shortly after the publication of William George Aston's History of Japanese Literature. The contest, number 27 of the magazine's ongoing series, drew dozens of entries, and the prize was awarded to R. M. Hansard:

The Academy contest inspired other experimentation with the format. Bertram Dobell published more than a dozen haikai in a 1901 verse collection, and in 1903 a group of Cambridge poets, citing Dobell as precedent, published their haikai series, "The Water Party." The Academy'''s influence was felt as far away as Australia, where editor Alfred Stephens was inspired to conduct a similar contest in the pages of The Bulletin. The prize for this (possibly first Australian) haiku contest went to Robert Crawford.

American writers
In the United States, Yone Noguchi published "A Proposal to American Poets," in The Reader Magazine in February 1904, giving a brief outline of his own English hokku efforts and ending with the exhortation, "Pray, you try Japanese Hokku, my American poets! You say far too much, I should say."

Ezra Pound's influential haiku-influenced poem, "In a Station of the Metro", published in 1913, has been widely regarded as a watershed moment in the establishment of English-language haiku as a literary form.

During the Imagist period, a number of mainstream poets, including Amy Lowell, Richard Aldington, and Lewis Grandison Alexander, published what were generally called hokku. Their efforts were actively encouraged by Noguchi, who published his own volume of English-language Japanese Hokkus in 1920.

Postwar revival

In the Beat period, original haiku were composed by Gary Snyder, Jack Kerouac, Richard Wright and James W. Hackett. Wright composed some 4,000 haiku (mostly with 5-7-5 syllabic structure).

The first English-language haiku group in America, founded in 1956, was the Writers' Roundtable of Los Altos, California, under the direction of Helen Stiles Chenoweth. The Haiku Society of America was founded in 1968 and began publishing its journal Frogpond in 1978.

In 1963 the journal American Haiku was founded in Platteville, Wisconsin, edited by the European-Americans James Bull and Donald Eulert. Among contributors to the first issue were poets James W. Hackett, O Mabson Southard, and Nick Virgilio. In the second issue of American Haiku Virgilio published his "lily" and "bass" haiku, which became models of brevity, breaking the conventional 5-7-5 syllabic form, and pointing toward the leaner conception of haiku that would take hold in subsequent decades.American Haiku ended publication in 1968 and was succeeded by Modern Haiku in 1969. Other early publications include Chenoweth's 1966 anthology Borrowed Water, featuring the work by the Los Altos Writers' Roundtable, and journals Haiku Highlights, founded 1965 by European-American writer Jean Calkins and later taken over by Lorraine Ellis Harr; Eric Amann's Haiku, founded 1967; and Leroy Kanterman's Haiku West founded 1967.

The first Haiku North America conference was held at Las Positas College in Livermore, California, in 1991, and has been held on alternating years since then. The American Haiku Archives, the largest public archive of haiku-related material outside Japan, was founded in 1996. It is housed at the California State Library in Sacramento, California, and includes the official archives of the Haiku Society of America.

Significant contributors to American haiku have included Lee Gurga, Jim Kacian, Elizabeth Searle Lamb, Raymond Roseliep, Marlene Mountain, Alan Pizzarelli, Alexis Rotella, George Swede, and Michael Dylan Welch.

Variant forms
Although the majority of haiku published in English are three lines long, variants also occur.

One line
The most common variation from the three-line standard is one line, sometimes called a monoku. It emerged from being more than an occasional exception during the late 1970s. The one-line form, based on an analogy with the one-line vertical column in which Japanese haiku are often printed, was lent legitimacy principally by three people:
 Marlene Mountain was one of the first English-language haiku poets to write haiku regularly in a single horizontal line.
 Hiroaki Sato translated Japanese haiku into one line in English.
 Matsuo Allard wrote essays in its favor and published several magazines and chapbooks devoted to the form, in addition to practicing it.

The single-line haiku usually contains fewer than seventeen syllables. A caesura (pause) may be appropriate, dictated by sense or speech rhythm (following the Japanese tradition of a break, marked by the Kireji), and usually little or no punctuation. This form was used by John Wills and, more recently, has been practiced by poets such as M. Kettner, Janice Bostok, Jim Kacian, Chris Gordon, Eve Luckring, Scott Metz, Stuart Quine, John Barlow, and many others.

The one-line form can create a variety of ambiguities allowing for multiple readings of the same haiku. A variation of the format breaks the line at the caesura or pause.

One word
A single word may occasionally be claimed to be a haiku:

Four or more lines
Haiku of four lines (sometimes known as haiqua) or longer have been written, some of them "vertical haiku" with only a word or two per line, mimicking the vertical printed form of Japanese haiku.

Circle
Haiku have also appeared in circular form (sometimes known as cirku) whereby the poem has no fixed start or end point.

Fixed form
In the "zip" form developed by John Carley, a haiku of 15 syllables is presented over two lines, each of which contains one internal caesura represented by a double space.Zips in Magma No 19 - Winter 2001

A fixed-form 5-3-5 syllable (or 3-5-3 word) haiku is sometimes known as a lune.Lipson, Greta B. Poetry Writing Handbook: Definitions, Examples, Lessons. Lorenz Educational Press, 1998.  p53

Publications in North America
The leading English-language haiku journals published in the U.S. include Modern Haiku, Frogpond (published by the Haiku Society of America), Mayfly (founded by Randy and Shirley Brooks in 1986), Acorn (founded by A. C. Missias in 1998), Bottle Rockets (founded by Stanford M. Forrester), The Heron's Nest (founded by Christopher Herold in 1999, published online with a print annual), and Tinywords (founded by Dylan F. Tweney in 2001). Some significant defunct publications include Brussels Sprout (edited from 1988 to 1995 by Francine Porad), Woodnotes (edited from 1989 to 1997 by Michael Dylan Welch), Hal Roth's Wind Chimes, Wisteria, and Moonset (edited from 2005 to 2009 by an'ya (Andja Petrović)). The largest publisher of haiku books in North America is Jim Kacian's Red Moon Press. Other notable American publishers of haiku books include Press Here, Bottle Rockets Press, Brooks Books, and Turtle Light Press.

Publications in other English-speaking countries
In the United Kingdom, leading publications include Presence (formerly Haiku Presence), which was edited for many years by Martin Lucas and is now edited by Ian Storr, and Blithe Spirit, published by the British Haiku Society and named in honor of Reginald Horace Blyth. In Ireland, twenty issues of Haiku Spirit edited by Jim Norton were published between 1995 and 2000, and Shamrock, an online journal edited by Anatoly Kudryavitsky, has been publishing international haiku in English since 2007. In Australia, twenty issues of Yellow Moon, a literary magazine for writers of haiku and other verse, were published between 1997 and 2006 (issues 1-8 were edited by Patricia Kelsall; issues 9-20 by Beverley George). Nowadays Paper Wasp is published in Australia, Kokako in New Zealand and Chrysanthemum (bilingual German/English) in Germany and Austria. Two other online English-language haiku journals founded outside North America, A Hundred Gourds and Notes from the Gean, are now defunct. John Barlow's Snapshot Press is a notable UK-based publisher of haiku books. The World Haiku Club publishes The World Haiku Review.

International websites have developed for the publication of haiku in English including: The Living Haiku Anthology; The Living Senryu Anthology, Under the Basho, Failed Haiku, and Wales Haiku Journal. In addition, personal websites such as Michael Dylan Welch's Graceguts provide extensive haiku resources with essays, reviews, and poems.

Notable English-language haiku poets

See also

Notes

References

Further reading
 The Haiku Society of America. A Haiku Path. Haiku Society of America, Inc., 1994.
 Henderson, Harold G. An Introduction to Haiku. Hokuseido Press, 1948.
 Henderson, Harold G. Haiku in English. Charles E. Tuttle Co., 1967.
 Higginson, William J. and Harter, Penny. The Haiku Handbook, How to Write, Share, and Teach Haiku. Kodansha, 1989. .
 Higginson, William J. Haiku World: An International Poetry Almanac. Kodansha, 1996. .
 Hirshfield, Jane. The Heart of Haiku (Kindle Single, 2011)
 Rosenstock, Gabriel. Haiku Enlightenment. Cambridge Scholars Publishing, 2011. 
 Rosenstock, Gabriel. Haiku: the Gentle Art of Disappearing. Cambridge Scholars Publishing, 2009.  
 Sato, Hiroaki. One Hundred Frogs, from renga to haiku to English. Weatherhill, 1983. .
 Suiter, John. Poets on the Peaks: Gary Snyder, Philip Whalen & Jack Kerouac in the Cascades. Counterpoint, 2002. ;  (pbk).
 Yasuda, Kenneth. Japanese Haiku: Its Essential Nature, History, and Possibilities in English. Tuttle, 1957. .

Anthologies
 Global Haiku. Eds. George Swede and Randy Brooks. IRON Press, 2000.
 Haiku 21. Eds. Lee Gurga and Scott Metz. Modern Haiku Press, 2011.
 The Haiku Anthology. Ed. Cor van den Heuvel. Anchor Books, 1974
 The Haiku Anthology. 2nd ed. Ed. Cor van den Heuvel. Simon & Schuster, 1986.
 The Haiku Anthology. 3rd ed. Ed. Cor van den Heuvel. W.W. Norton, 1999.
 Haiku in English. Eds. Jim Kacian, Philip Rowland, and Allan Burns. W.W. Norton, 2013.
 Haiku Moment. Ed. Bruce Ross. Charles E. Tuttle Co., 1993.
 The San Francisco Haiku Anthology. Eds. Jerry Ball, Garry Gay, and Tom Tico. Smythe-Waithe Press, 1992.
 The Unswept Path. Eds. John Brandi and Dennis Maloney. White Pine Press, 2005.
 Where the River Goes: The Nature Tradition in English-Language Haiku''. Ed. Allan Burns. Snapshot Press, 2013.

Periodicals
A Guide to Haiku Publications, 2008 from HSA

Archives
 American Haiku Archives

Techniques and papers
Jane Reichhold on haiku techniques
English Haiku : A Composite View on the British Haiku Society website
 Haiku Chronicles – a free educational podcast designed to provide a better understanding and appreciation of the art of haiku and its related forms.
"In The Moonlight a Worm..." - an educational site on haiku writing techniques.

Haikai forms
English poetry